The Stones River Campaign of the American Civil War lasted from November 1862 to January 1863. The campaign  was tactically a draw but was a strategic Union victory due to the Confederate retreat after the Battle of Stones River.

 
1862 in Tennessee
1863 in Tennessee
Campaigns of the Western Theater of the American Civil War